Florence Township is located in Will County, Illinois. As of the 2010 census, its population was 933 and it contained 370 housing units. Florence Township was formed from a portion of Wilmington Township at an unknown date.

Geography

Demographics

References

External links
City-data.com
Will County Official Site
Illinois State Archives

Townships in Will County, Illinois
Townships in Illinois